Northern Arizona Lumberjacks cross country are the cross country teams of Northern Arizona University in Flagstaff, Arizona. The Lumberjacks compete in the Big Sky Conference at the Division I level in the NCAA and are head coached by Michael Smith.

The Lumberjacks have won 6 national championships and were runner up 3 times. Many of the team's runners compete in the Olympic Games, with alumni representing a total of 11 nations since the program's foundation.

History

Men's team 
The team was runner's up at the NCAA Men's Division I Cross Country Championship in 1988, 1995, 2013.

Since 2016, the Northern Arizona men's team has been considered as the nation's leading program in NCAA Division I, winning a three-peat National Championship run from 2016-2018 and being undefeated in the regular season. The team has won 20 of the last 25 Big Sky team championships and won 17 of the last 25 Big Sky individual titles as of 2017. The team has been consistently ranked in the top 3 of the USTFCCCA national coach's poll since the start of the 2016 season. The team was the runner up in the 2019 national championship. In the first tie-breaker ever to win the National Championship, the Lumberjacks narrowly won the 2022 iteration of the National Championship over Oklahoma State University to complete another three-peat.  

The 2017 repeat title closed out a perfect season with a 53-point victory, placing five athletes in the top 40. The victory was the lowest score (74) at the NCAA Championships since 2014, and the Lumberjacks became the first repeat champions since 2013–14. Director of Cross Country and Track and Field Michael Smith earned the Bill Dellinger Award as National Men's Coach of the Year and also picked up both the Big Sky's Men's and Women's Coach of the Year awards. In track and field, Smith was named the US Track & Field and Cross Country Coaches Association (USTFCCCA) Mountain Region Women's Indoor Coach of the Year in 2017 and 2018.

National championships

Men's team national championships (6)

Women's individual national championships (2)

Rivals 
When Michael Smith became head coach in 2016 NAU turned into a national cross country powerhouse, developing a rivalry with the other nationally ranked leader, the BYU Cougars. NAU defeated the BYU in the 2018 Championship while next year BYU defeated NAU in the 2019 Championship. The rivalry has been considered as "the best in a long time" and "the greatest in NCAA cross country history."

Media 
The team was exclusively featured in the FloTrack documentary The Program: Northern Arizona that followed them in their championship 2016 season. The team was again featured in the five-part docuseries NAU: Running With The Boys that followed them throughout their 2019 season.

References 

 
College cross country teams in the United States